Grevels is a small town in the commune of Wahl, in western Luxembourg. , the town has a population of 196. Nearby is the source of the Wark.

Redange (canton)
Towns in Luxembourg